The 2013 Finnish Figure Skating Championships took place between December 14 and 16, 2012 in Joensuu. Skaters competed in the disciplines of men's singles, ladies' singles, and ice dancing on the senior and junior levels. The results were one of the criteria used to choose the Finnish teams to the 2013 World Championships, 2013 European Championships, and 2013 World Junior Championships.

Senior results

Men

Ladies

Ice dance

External links
 2013 Finnish Championships results
 info

2013
2013 in figure skating
2012 in figure skating
Figure Skating Championships,2013
Figure Skating Championships,2013